Holbrook Bodies Limited of Holbrook Lane, Foleshill, Coventry was a coachbuilder which made series coachbuilt bodies for low volume car manufacturers.  Opened in 1926 it suffered a financial collapse in 1933 and its premises (apparently previously occupied by Motor Bodies (Coventry) Limited) were later taken over by the adjacent plant of SS Cars. It was run by a Capt. Stonehouse backed by William Oubridge of the British Piston Ring Company.

References

External links
Coventry Archives and Research Centre Holbrook Bodies Ltd, Holbrook Lane, Coventry, 1929-1930

Holbrook Coventry
Holbrook Bodies
Manufacturing companies established in 1926
Manufacturing companies disestablished in 1933
1926 establishments in England
British companies established in 1926
1933 disestablishments in England
British companies disestablished in 1933